The 2019 season of the 4. divisjon, the fifth highest association football league for men in Norway.

Between 16 and 26 games (depending on group size) are played in 24 groups, with 3 points given for wins and 1 for draws.

According to a proposal at the 2018 Football Convention, fewer teams would be relegated from the 2019 3. divisjon to the 2020 4. divisjon, and accordingly, fewer teams would be promoted. The groups affected would be the group 1 and 9 winners who would contest a single promotion spot; the group 2–4 winners who would contest two promotion spots; the group 6 and 7 winners who would contest a single promotion spot; the group 8 and 10 winners who would contest a single promotion spot; the group 17 and 18 winners who would contest a single promotion spot; and the group 21 and 22 winners who would contest a single promotion spot. The playoff between the group 21 and 22 winners was cancelled.

Incidentally, the 2020 4. divisjon was cancelled before commencing because of the COVID-19 pandemic in Norway, so the promotions and relegations first came into effect in the 2021 4. divisjon.

Teams 

Group 1
Fredrikstad 2 − promoted
Kvik Halden 2
Sprint-Jeløy
Råde
Østsiden
Borgen
Moss 2
Kråkerøy 2
Selbak
Sarpsborg
Ås
Rakkestad
Idd − relegated
Sparta Sarpsborg − relegated

Group 2
Nesodden − lost playoff
Oppsal 2
Sagene
Ullern 2
Majorstuen
Manglerud Star
Heggedal (merged with Vollen post-season)
Lommedalen
Follo 2
Holmen
Korsvoll − relegated
Oslo City − relegated

Group 3
Grorud 2 − promoted
KFUM 2
Oslojuvelene
Vollen (merged with Heggedal post-season)
Kolbotn
Stabæk 3
Asker 2
Holmlia
Lyn 2
Furuset − relegated
Hasle-Løren − relegated
Langhus (evicted)

Group 4
Skeid 2 − promoted
Rilindja
Heming
Kjelsås 2
Bærum 2
Christiania
Fagerborg
Fremad Famagusta
Ready 2
Ski − relegated
Vestli (merged with Rommen post-season)
Wam-Kam − relegated

Group 5
Fu/Vo – promoted
Skedsmo
Kløfta
Blaker
Eidsvold
Aurskog-Høland
Sørumsand
Lørenskog 2
Fjellhamar
Raumnes & Årnes
Strømmen 2
Eidsvold Turn 2
Fet – relegated
Rælingen – relegated

Group 6
Toten – promoted
Løten
Kolbukameratene
Gran
Reinsvoll
Furnes
Sander
Eidskog – relegated
Ridabu – relegated
Brumunddal 2 – relegated
MBK Domkirkeodden – relegated
Flisa – relegated

Group 7
Trysil – lost playoff
Faaberg
Ham-Kam 2
Lillehammer
Engerdal
Ottestad
Moelven – relegated
Ringsaker – relegated
Redalen – relegated
Follebu – relegated
Storhamar – relegated
Gjøvik-Lyn 2 – relegated

Group 8
Åssiden – promoted
Modum
Drammens BK
Jevnaker
Svelvik
Konnerud
Solberg
Hallingdal
Huringen
Kongsberg
Stoppen
Birkebeineren
Steinberg – relegated
Holeværingen – pulled team

Group 9
Sandefjord 2 – lost playoff
Teie
Eik Tønsberg – merged with FK Tønsberg post-season)
Larvik Turn
FK Tønsberg 2 – merged with Eik Tønsberg post-season)
Runar
Sandefjord BK
Stokke
Ørn-Horten 2
Re
Borre
Husøy & Foynland – relegated

Group 10
Urædd – lost playoff
Odd 3
Hei
Skarphedin
Ulefoss/Skade (merged to Nome post-season)
Notodden 2
Pors 2
Stathelle og Omegn
Langesund
Storm 2 – relegated
Tollnes – relegated
Herkules – relegated

Group 11
Express – promoted
Søgne
Flekkefjord – withdrew post-season
Fløy 2
Våg
Arendal 2 – withdrew post-season
Jerv 2
Lyngdal
Hisøy
Vigør
Randesund
Kvinesdal
Farsund – relegated
Tveit – relegated

Group 12
Hinna – promoted
Eiger
Sandnes Ulf 2
Randaberg
Riska
Hana
Austrått
Vidar 2
Sunde
Egersund 2
Havdur
Hundvåg
Midtbygden – relegated
Voll – relegated

Group 13
Åkra – promoted
Frøyland
Haugesund 2
Varhaug
Kopervik
Ålgård
Vaulen
Skjold
Sola 2
Lura
Vard Haugesund 2
Nærbø
Klepp
Torvastad – pulled team

Group 14
Bjarg – promoted
Arna-Bjørnar
Loddefjord
Tertnes
Åsane 2
Gneist
Sund
Fyllingsdalen 2
Osterøy
Smørås
Flaktveit – relegated
Vestsiden-Askøy – relegated

Group 15
Sandviken – promoted
Frøya
Lyngbø
Bremnes
NHH
Trott
Varegg
Djerv
Os 2
Trio – relegated
Øystese – relegated
Solid – relegated

Group 16
Årdal − promoted
Førde
Eid
Studentspretten
Stryn
Kaupanger
Tornado Måløy (merged with Skavøypoll post-season)
Høyang
Syril
Bremanger
Dale
Florø 2 – relegated

Group 17
Volda − promoted
Bergsøy
Rollon
Valder
Hødd 2
SIF/Hessa
Larsnes/Gursken
Norborg/Brattvåg 2
Emblem
Hareid
Ørsta – relegated
Blindheim – relegated

Group 18
Kristiansund 2 – lost playoff
Eide og Omegn
Surnadal
Dahle
Kristiansund FK
Malmefjorden
Tomrefjord
Midsund
Vestnes Varfjell
Åndalsnes
Averøykameratene – relegated
Elnesvågen og Omegn – relegated

Group 19
NTNUI − promoted
Rørvik
Levanger 2
Namsos
Vuku
Kvik
Fram
Nardo 2
Charlottenlund
Stjørdals-Blink 2
Vanvik – relegated
Ørland – relegated

Group 20
Tynset − promoted
Trygg/Lade
Heimdal
Orkla 2
Byåsen 2
Rennebu
Sverresborg
KIL/Hemne
Hitra
Svorkmo NOI
Meldal – relegated
Røros – relegated

Group 21
Rana − promoted
Fauske/Sprint
Mosjøen
Grand Bodø
Sandnessjøen
Innstranda
Åga – relegated
Brønnøysund – relegated
Hemnes – relegated

Group 22
Skånland − promoted
Lofoten
Morild (withdrew post-season)
Grovfjord (defunct post-season)
Landsås
Andenes
Sortland
Melbo 2
Ballstad
Harstad 2 – relegated
Svolvær – relegated
Medkila − pulled team, but not relegated

Group 23
Fløya 2 − folded post-season
Krokelvdalen
Skarp
Tromsdalen 2
Salangen
Stakkevollan
Bardufoss og Omegn
Nordkjosbotn (defunct post-season)
Lyngen/Karnes
Finnsnes 2
Storelva
Ishavsbyen

Group 24
Tverrelvdalen − declined promotion and went defunct
HIF/Stein
Porsanger
Kirkenes
Alta 2
Bjørnevatn
Bossekop
Tana (defunct post-season)
Honningsvåg (withdrew post-season)
Sørøy Glimt
Indrefjord – relegated
Nordlys

Playoffs
Fredrikstad 2 beat Sandefjord 2
Grorud 2 and Skeid 2 beat Nesodden
Toten beat Trysil
Åssiden beat Urædd
Volda beat Kristiansund 2

References
NIFS

5
Norway
Norway
Norwegian Fourth Division seasons